Alberto Martín Romo García Adámez (born 31 March 1989), known simply as Alberto, is a Spanish footballer who plays for UD Melilla as a midfielder.

Club career
Alberto was born in Don Benito, Province of Badajoz. He started playing as a senior in the 2008–09 season with CD Don Benito, in Tercera División. He signed for UD Almería one year later, being initially assigned to the B team also in the fourth division.

On 28 April 2012, Alberto was first called up by the main squad, being selected for a Segunda División game against Deportivo de La Coruña. He made his competitive debut the following day, coming on as an 84th-minute substitute for Dani Bautista in an eventual 2–0 home win.

On 16 July 2013, Alberto joined Segunda División B club CD Leganés. He appeared in 30 matches during the campaign (six in the play-offs), achieving promotion.

Alberto scored his first professional goal on 24 August 2014, opening the 1–1 home draw against Deportivo Alavés. In 2015–16, he contributed 28 appearances as the side were promoted to La Liga for the first time ever.

Alberto made his debut in the Spanish top flight on 22 August 2016, starting in a 1–0 away victory over RC Celta de Vigo. On 7 July of the following year, he signed a two-year deal with Granada CF.

References

External links

1989 births
Living people
People from Don Benito
Sportspeople from the Province of Badajoz
Spanish footballers
Footballers from Extremadura
Association football midfielders
La Liga players
Segunda División players
Segunda División B players
Tercera División players
Segunda Federación players
CD Don Benito players
UD Almería B players
UD Almería players
CD Leganés players
Granada CF footballers
Recreativo de Huelva players
UD Melilla footballers